The Stearman XOSS was an American biplane observation floatplane developed by Stearman Aircraft for the United States Navy during the late 1930s. Intended to replace the Curtiss SOC Seagull in service aboard battleships, it proved inferior to the Vought OS2U Kingfisher in a fly-off, and did not enter production.

Design and development
Known by the company designation Model X-85, the Stearman XOSS-1 was designed during 1937 in response to a U.S. Navy specification calling for an observation-scout type aircraft, capable of operating from either water or land, and stressed for catapult launching from battleships and cruisers. The new aircraft was intended to replace the Curtiss SOC as the standard observation and gunnery spotting aircraft in service aboard the Navy's battleships.

In response to the request for proposals, the Navy received designs from Stearman Aircraft, Chance Vought, and the Naval Aircraft Factory. The Stearman Model 85, given the designation XOSS-1, was a conventional two-seat biplane, with the pilot and observer seated in tandem in a fully enclosed cockpit. The aircraft could be operated with either float or wheeled landing gear, with the former being of the single center-float type, and the latter being a conventional taildragger undercarriage. The XOSS-1 had the unusual feature of being fitted with full-span flaps on the upper wing to reduce stalling speed. It was powered by a Pratt & Whitney R-1340 Wasp radial engine.

Operational history
Flying for the first time in September 1938, the XOSS-1 proved to have benign flying characteristics, and over the next several months was evaluated against the Naval Aircraft Factory XOSN, another conventional biplane, and the Vought XOS2U, a mid-wing monoplane.

Both the XOSS-1 and the XOSN-1, despite not possessing any significant faults, were considered to be insufficiently advanced, being inferior in performance and potential to the Vought machine. The XOS2U-1 was declared the winner of the competition in May 1939, and the XOSS-1's development came to an end. The aircraft was used for liaison purposes by the Navy, being scrapped at NAS Jacksonville in 1941.

Operators

United States Navy

Specifications (XOSS-1)

See also

References

Citations

Bibliography

External links

 Stearman XOSS-1 at Aviation Enthusiast Corner.

OS0S
1930s United States military reconnaissance aircraft
Single-engined tractor aircraft
Biplanes
Floatplanes
Aircraft first flown in 1938